The Service Union United (PAM) is a trade union representing service sector workers in Finland.

The union was founded in 2000, when the Business Union merged with the Caretakers' Union, the Hotel and Restaurant Workers' Union, and the Technical and Special Trades Union.  Like its predecessor, the union affiliated to the Central Organisation of Finnish Trade Unions.

As of 2020, the union had about 210,000 members.

Presidents
2000: Maj-Len Remahl
2002: Ann Selin
2019: Annika Rönni-Sällinen

External links

References

Trade unions established in 2000
Trade unions in Finland
2000 establishments in Finland